Dolin is a small uninhabited island in the Croatian part of the Adriatic Sea. It is located in the Kvarner Gulf, just off the southern coast of the island of Rab. Its area is 4.61 km2 and its coastline is 18.5 km long.

See also
Rab
Kvarner Gulf

References

Uninhabited islands of Croatia
Islands of the Adriatic Sea